Charity Castle is a 1917 American silent comedy-drama film directed by Lloyd Ingraham and starring Mary Miles Minter. As is the case with many of Minter's features, it is thought to be a lost film.

Plot

As described and illustrated in various film magazines, when the mother of Charity (Minter) and her little brother, whom she calls "The Prince," passes away, they are left in the care of her tenant, Merlin Durand (Forrest). He is the son of a millionaire, but his miserly father, who disapproves of his extravagant lifestyle, has banished him from home until he can produce his first week's pay-check.

When Merlin's bills pile up, Charity takes pity on him, and decides that she and her brother will talk his father into taking him back. They go to the father's house and find it deserted; Simon Durand has gone to "take the waters" and the servants have seized the opportunity to take the night off. Charity and the Prince promptly move into the house and call it their castle, as they wait for the father's return.

That night, Bill the burglar (Turner) breaks into the house, but Charity charms him into becoming their protector. To complete this unconventional household, Sam the bum (Russell) and Lucius (Aitken), a stranded actor, soon join them. When Simon Durand returns, he is at first furious to find these strangers in his home; Charity, however, soon wins him over, and he decides to keep on Bill, Sam and Lucius in place of his absent servants.

Merlin, meanwhile, has managed to secure a job. With his first pay-check in hand, he goes to see his father, where he is overjoyed to find his wards safe and sound. Father and son are reconciled, and all live happily in the newly-renamed "Charity Castle."

Cast
 Mary Miles Minter as Charity
 Clifford Callis as The Prince
 Allan Forrest as Merlin Durand
 Eugenie Forde as Zelma Verona
 Henry A. Barrows as Simon Durand 
 Ashton Dearholt as Elmer Trent
 Robert Klein as Graves
 Spottiswoode Aitken as Lucius Garrett
 George Ahearn as Bill Turner
 J. Gordon Russell as Sam Smith

References

External links

1917 films
1917 comedy-drama films
American silent feature films
American black-and-white films
Films directed by Lloyd Ingraham
Lost American films
American Film Company films
Mutual Film films
1917 lost films
Lost comedy-drama films
1910s American films
Silent American comedy-drama films
1910s English-language films